Kan extensions are universal constructs in category theory, a branch of mathematics. They are closely related to adjoints, but are also related to limits and ends. They are named after Daniel M. Kan, who constructed certain (Kan) extensions using limits in 1960.

An early use of (what is now known as) a Kan extension from 1956 was in homological algebra to compute derived functors.

In Categories for the Working Mathematician Saunders Mac Lane titled a section "All Concepts Are Kan Extensions", and went on to write that

The notion of Kan extensions subsumes all the other fundamental concepts of category theory.

Kan extensions generalize the notion of extending a function defined on a subset to a function defined on the whole set. The definition, not surprisingly, is at a high level of abstraction. When specialised to posets, it becomes a relatively familiar type of question on constrained optimization.

Definition

A Kan extension proceeds from the data of three categories 

and two functors

,

and comes in two varieties: the "left" Kan extension and the "right" Kan extension of  along .

The right Kan extension amounts to finding the dashed arrow and the natural transformation  in the following diagram:

Formally, the right Kan extension of  along  consists of a functor  and a natural transformation  that is couniversal with respect to the specification, in the sense that for any functor  and natural transformation , a unique natural transformation  is defined and fits into a commutative diagram:

 

The functor R is often written .

As with the other universal constructs in category theory, the "left" version of the Kan extension is dual to the "right" one and is obtained by replacing all categories by their opposites. 

The effect of this on the description above is merely to reverse the direction of the natural transformations. 

This gives rise to the alternate description: the left Kan extension of  along  consists of a functor  and a natural transformation  that are universal with respect to this specification, in the sense that for any other functor  and natural transformation , a unique natural transformation  exists and fits into a commutative diagram:

 

The functor L is often written .

The use of the word "the" (as in "the left Kan extension") is justified by the fact that, as with all universal constructions, if the object defined exists, then it is unique up to unique isomorphism. Likewise for right Kan extensions.

Properties

Kan extensions as (co)limits
If A is small and C is cocomplete, then there exists a left Kan extension  of  along , defined at each object b of B by

where the colimit is taken over the comma category , where  is the constant functor. Dually, if A is small and C is complete, then right Kan extensions along  exist, and can be computed as the limit 

over the comma category .

Kan extensions as (co)ends

when the above coend exists for every object c of C.

Dually, right Kan extensions can be computed by the end formula

Limits as Kan extensions
The limit of a functor  can be expressed as a Kan extension by

The colimit of  can be expressed similarly by

Adjoints as Kan extensions

Applications

The codensity monad of a functor  is a right Kan extension of G along itself.

References

External links 
Model independent proof of colimit formula for left Kan extensions

Kan extension as a limit: an example

Adjoint functors
Category theory